Richard James "Hen" Henshall is a British progressive metal multi-instrumentalist. He is best known for being the guitarist and keyboardist for the bands To-Mera, Haken, Nova Collective, and Opinaut. He has released one album (Exile) with To-Mera, six (Aquarius, Visions, The Mountain, Affinity, Vector, and Virus) with Haken, and one solo album (The Cocoon). He has also released EPs and singles:   Oxygen (with Opinaut), Redemption (with Alma West), Earthbound (with To-Mera), and Restoration (with Haken). Henshall was classically trained on the piano from the age of seven. By the age of 11 to 12, he started playing the guitar on a self-taught basis. He also had drums and clarinet classes.

To-Mera

To-Mera formed in 2005 between a few friends, Julie Kiss (vocals), Thomas MacLean (guitar), Lee Barrett (bass), Akos Pirisi (drums), Hugo Sheppard (keyboard). They released a demo, which caught the attention of Candlelight Records. The band's musical style was drastically different from conventional progressive metal; the band drew upon a plethora of influences such as progressive rock. In 2006, To-Mera released Transcendental through Candlelight. The radical new style opened up slots to open for groups such as Dream Theater, Fates Warning, and Emperor. In 2008, To-Mera released their next album, Delusions. In 2009, they parted with Candlelight. Hugo Sheppard left after this, and they hired Henshall as replacement. They then self-released their EP Earthbound.

Haken

Haken was formed by school friends Ross Jennings (vocals), Matthew Marshall (guitar), and Henshall at first in 2004. The members parted ways for a while to study at university, reuniting in 2007. The current members hired Peter Jones on keyboards and Raymond Hearne on drums. Jones left soon after, and was replaced by Diego Tejeida. Charlie Griffiths was found on guitar, and Henshall brought in To-Mera bandmate Tom Maclean on bass.

Henshall has composed most of Haken's songs by himself and contributed to some of the lyrics. He composed the whole Aquarius album alone, most of Visions (except "Premonition", co-written with keyboardist Diego Tejeida and bassist Thomas MacLean; and "Insomnia", written by all members), and most of The Mountain (except "As Death Embraces", written by Tejeida). In this album, Henshall (as well as every other instrumentalist in the band) contributed with lyrics for the first time, on the song "Cockroach King". He would be credited as a lyricist again in the band's 2014 EP Restoration, for the song "Crystallised" (co-written with Hearne and Griffiths). Affinity (2016) and Vector (2018) both credited all songwriting to every band member.

Opinaut
Opinaut formed in early 2011 from a group of four musicians working at the Sutton Music Centre. All four were talented multi-instrumentalists who worked in music full-time as session players and tutors. The members are: Jon Hart on vocals, John Vince on drums, Henshall on guitar, and Samuel Brooks on bass. Opinaut’s style is a merge of drum and bass rock with dreamy electro vibes and epic chord sequences. Their EP Oxygen was released in 2011 and is available online.

Influences
Henshall has named many influences, such as jazz and conventional progressive rock, as well as many notable acts, such as Dream Theater, Allan Holdsworth, Shawn Lane, John Petrucci, Wes Montgomery, Chet Atkins, Jerry Reed, Yes, Pain of Salvation, Jethro Tull, Johann Sebastian Bach, Debussy, Rachmaninov, Chopin, Gomez, Muse, Pink Floyd, Mozart, Aphex Twin, Magnum, Earth, Wind & Fire, Jordan Rudess, Prince, Michael Jackson, Queen, The Beatles, Ocean Colour Scene, Al Di Meola, John Williams, Danny Elfman, Ray Charles, The Pharcyde, De La Soul, Jeff Beck, EPMD, James Brown, Symphony X, Adagio, Devin Townsend, Knuckledust, Stampin, ELP, Björk, Sigur Rós, Bob Dylan, Opeth, Curtis Mayfield, RATM, Sikth, Hatebreed, and Mike Oldfield, among others.

Discography

Solo
(2019) The Cocoon

With To-Mera
(2009) Earthbound (EP)
(2012) Exile

With Haken
Enter the 5th Dimension (Demo) (2008) 
Aquarius (2010) 
Visions (2011) 
The Mountain (2013) 
Restoration (EP) (2014) 
Affinity (2016)
L-1VE (Live Album) (2018)
Vector (2018)
Virus (2020)
Fauna (2023)

With Nova Collective
The Further Side (2017)

With Opinaut
(2011) Oxygen (EP)

With Rainmask
(2018) Walls (Single)
(2018) Lighting Up the Sky (Single)

With Alma West 
 (2019) Redemption

With Andy Simmons 
 (2020) Duplicated Motion (EP)

References 

Progressive metal guitarists
English heavy metal guitarists
English heavy metal keyboardists
English rock bass guitarists
Male bass guitarists
English heavy metal drummers
English composers
Living people
1984 births
21st-century drummers
21st-century English bass guitarists
21st-century British male musicians